Northeast Metropolitan Regional Vocational High School also known as Northeast Metro Tech or The Voke  is a regional vocational school located in Wakefield, Massachusetts, United States. It was founded in 1968 and draws students from the cities and towns of Chelsea, Revere, Winthrop, Malden, Melrose, North Reading, Reading, Stoneham, Wakefield, Winchester, Woburn and Saugus.

The number of students each city or town sends is dependent on its population and the amount of money it contributes to the budget of the school. The City of Malden is the largest contributor of students, Chelsea is the second largest contributor, and Woburn is the third. Also, students from Everett, Lynn, Lynnfield and Medford, which border the Northeast Metropolitan Regional Vocational School District, may attend the school if they apply and are approved.

The football team has recently won back-to-back Division 4A State Championships in 2009 and 2010.

Shops
The following technical programs are available:

Automotive Collision Repair and Refinishing   
Automotive Technology
Carpentry
Cosmetology
Culinary Art's
Dental Assisting
Design & Visual/Graphics Communications II
Drafting & Design
Early Childhood Education
Electricity
Health Assisting
HVAC/Refrigeration
Metal Fabrication
Business Technology
Plumbing & Pipe-fitting
Robotics & Automation
STEM Experience

References

Commonwealth Athletic Conference
Schools in Middlesex County, Massachusetts
Public high schools in Massachusetts